This is a list of Nigerian films scheduled for theatrical release in 2017.

2017

January–March

April–June

October–December

More
 Bariga Sugar
 A Hotel Called Memory
 Affairs of the Heart
 Tiwa's Baggage
 Tough Love

See also
2017 in Nigeria
List of Nigerian films

References

External links
2018 films at the Internet Movie Database
Nigerian actors biography at Uzomedia TV

2017
Lists of 2017 films by country or language
Films